Hogeveen is a hamlet in the Dutch province of South Holland. It is located in the municipality of Alphen aan den Rijn, about 2 km south of Hazerswoude-Dorp.

Hogeveen (then also spelled Hoogeveen) was a separate municipality between 1817 and 1855, when it merged with Benthuizen. The municipality was often called "Hoogeveen in Rijnland" to distinguish it from the municipality Hoogeveen in Delfland, also in South Holland.

References

Populated places in South Holland
Former municipalities of South Holland
Alphen aan den Rijn